NGC 5929 is a Seyfert galaxy in the constellation Boötes. The pair of galaxies, NGC 5929 and  NGC 5930, are interacting.

References

External links

Image of NGC 5929

Interacting galaxies
NGC 5929
5929
09851
Seyfert galaxies
5929